Stanley Lewis Yerkes (November 28, 1874 – July 28, 1940) nicknamed "Yank", was a professional baseball pitcher. He played in Major League Baseball from 1901-03 for the Baltimore Orioles and St. Louis Cardinals. Yerkes set many career highs during the 1903 season while pitching for the Cardinals. He appeared in 39 games (starting 37) during that season, and had a 12-21 record with a 3.66 ERA.

See also
 List of St. Louis Cardinals team records

External links

Major League Baseball pitchers
Baltimore Orioles (1901–02) players
St. Louis Cardinals players
Philadelphia Colts players
Scranton Indians players
Shenandoah Huns players
Carbondale Anthracites players
Lancaster Chicks players
Philadelphia Athletics (minor league) players
Pawtucket Phenoms players
Scranton Red Sox players
Cortland Hirelings players
Reading Coal Heavers players
Rochester Patriots players
Ottawa Wanderers players
Johnstown Mormans players
Palmyra Mormans players
Oswego Grays players
Schenectady Electricians players
Utica Pentups players
Omaha Omahogs players
Pueblo Indians players
Marion Glass Blowers players
Providence Grays (minor league) players
Buffalo Bisons (minor league) players
San Francisco Seals (baseball) players
Harrisburg Senators players
Waterbury Authors players
Nashville Vols players
Galveston Sand Crabs players
Baseball players from Pennsylvania
19th-century baseball players
1874 births
1940 deaths
People from Cheltenham, Pennsylvania
Sportspeople from Montgomery County, Pennsylvania
Bridgeton (minor league baseball) players